Felidhu Atoll (also, Felidhe Atoll) is a natural atoll of the Maldives.

It is the least populated administrative atoll.

The easternmost geographical point of the Maldives is located at Foiytheyo Muli, close to Foiytheyobodufushi Island.

No remains from the Buddhist period have been found on this atoll. However the island of Thinadhoo was famous for its old coral stone mosque noted for its fine masonry and woodcarvings comparable to those glorified by Thor Heyerdahl in  Kudahuvadhoo. It was destroyed in the 1980s for building material and all that remains are four solid coral pillars that rest in the island school yard.

References

 Divehi Tārīkhah Au Alikameh. Divehi Bahāi Tārikhah Khidmaiykurā Qaumī Markazu. Reprint 1958 edn. Malé 1990. 
 Divehiraajjege Jōgrafīge Vanavaru. Muhammadu Ibrahim Lutfee. G.Sōsanī.
 Romero-Frias, Xavier. The Maldive Islanders, A Study of the Popular Culture of an Ancient Ocean Kingdom. Barcelona 1999.

Atolls of the Maldives